Hughs may refer to:
The plural of Hugh in any sense
A misspelling of the surname Hughes

People with the surname
Ruth R. Hughs, American lawyer and politician

See also
Witham St Hughs, village in Lincolnshire, England